Undertaker is another name for a funeral director, someone involved in the business of funeral rites.

Undertaker or The Undertaker may also refer to:

In music
Undertakers, a Norwegian hard-rock/punk band
The Undertakers (band), a mid-1960s beat group
The Undertaker, an unreleased album by Prince
"Undertaker", a song by M. Ward from his 2003 album Transfiguration of Vincent
"Undertaker", a song by T.I. from his 2006 album King
"The Undertaker (Renholdër Mix)", a song by Puscifer first released on the 2006 soundtrack Underworld: Evolution
"Undertaker", a song by CocoRosie from their 2010 album Grey Oceans
"Undertaker", a song by electro house musician Wolfgang Gartner from his 2010 single of the same name

In film and television
The Undertaker (1932 film), a Czech comedy
The Undertaker (1988 film), an American slasher film
Undertaker, a character in the anime series Black Butler
"The Undertakers" (The Avengers), a 1963 episode of the British television series The Avengers
Shinei "The Undertaker" Nōzen, a character in the anime series 86

History
 Undertaker (17th century), a financier of the Plantations of Ireland
 Undertaker (18th century), a leader of the pro-government faction in the Irish Parliament

Sports teams
Port Glasgow F.C., a Scottish football club nicknamed the Undertakers
Houston Takers, an American Basketball Association team formerly known as the Houston Undertakers

People
The Undertaker (nickname)
The Undertaker, ring name of WWE professional wrestler Mark Calaway (born 1965)
Brian Lee (wrestler) (born 1966), a professional wrestler who went by the ring name of The Undertaker as an impostor
The Undertaker, stage name of DJ, rapper, and producer Prince Paul (born 1967) while performing in horrorcore rap group Gravediggaz
The Undertakers, a professional wrestling Jobber tag-team

Other uses
"The Undertaker", a short story by Alexander Pushkin
Undertaker (comics), a short series of comic books based on wrestler Mark Calaway

See also
Undertaking (disambiguation)